The 1988–89 Auburn Tigers men's basketball team represented Auburn University in the 1988–89 college basketball season. The team's head coach was Sonny Smith, who was in his eleventh and final season at Auburn. The team played their home games at Joel H. Eaves Memorial Coliseum in Auburn, Alabama. They finished the season 9–19, 2–16 in SEC play. They lost to Ole Miss in the first round of the SEC tournament.

The Tigers' season was beset with many problems.  Junior forward John Caylor, expected to be a key contributor this season, was lost after five games due to a life-threatening blood clot in his shoulder.

Junior guard Derrick Dennison, another key contributor from last season, quit the team over a feud with Coach Smith about a reduced role, but later returned.  Additionally, forward Kelvin Ardister, a junior-college transfer, and freshman guard Johnny Benjamin were both dismissed from the team after seven games for violating team rules.  Prior to his dismissal, Benjamin had been arrested and imprisoned on two misdemeanor charges, criminal trespassing and third-degree theft of property, when he entered a student's off-campus apartment and took an undisclosed amount of money.

After the season, coach Sonny Smith resigned and took the head coaching position at VCU.

Roster

References

Schedule and Results

|-
!colspan=12 style=| Regular season

Auburn Tigers men's basketball seasons
Auburn
Auburn Tigers
Auburn Tigers